Oduro is a surname. Notable people with the surname include:

 Abena Oduro (born 1959), Ghanaian economist
 Akwasi Oduro (born 1987), Belgian footballer
 Christabel Oduro (born 1992), Canadian soccer player
 Dominic Oduro (born 1985), Ghanaian footballer
 Stephen Oduro (born 1983), Ghanaian footballer 

Surnames of Akan origin